X-Men: The Official Game (also known as X3: The Official Game) is the name of Activision's three tie-in video games to the 2006 film X-Men: The Last Stand. The game covers the events between the films X2 and X-Men: The Last Stand, specifically following the characters of Logan, Iceman, and Nightcrawler. It also bridges the gap between the two films, explaining why Nightcrawler is not present for The Last Stand, and also introduces new foes for the game, such as HYDRA.

The game uses several voice actors from the X-Men film franchise. From the films, returning are Hugh Jackman, Alan Cumming, Shawn Ashmore, Patrick Stewart, Tyler Mane, and Eric Dane.

The game, along with most other games published by Activision that had used the Marvel licence, was de-listed and removed from all digital storefronts on January 1, 2014.

Gameplay
Players control the actions of several X-Men-related characters, most notably Logan, Nightcrawler and Iceman, as they uncover a plot to eradicate mutants. Sometimes, another X-Man will help the player's character battle. The Nintendo DS game features Magneto as a playable character, while the Game Boy Advance version features Colossus as a playable character. Many agree that Logan is the only useful character in the Game Boy Advance game, which allows players to cycle through characters at will, as he is the only one who can recover from damage.

Consoles
 Logan's levels involve fighting hordes of soldiers, armed with weapons. He can retract his claws, but any time a button is pressed, they are extracted. Logan heals minor wounds, reflected as yellow on his Life Gauge, but when his minor wound damage empties, all wounds are considered major, taking off his actual life bar. Logan can only heal major damage if he is not engaged in combat at the time. Logan can't target lock like his allies; he can only block, which can fend off weak attacks only until it is built up. Wolverine, after he has attacked for a time, builds up a Fury Bar, which, when activated, increases his healing rate and his strength. It also changes his attacks' appearances.
 Nightcrawler's levels involve mostly platforming missions, running along pipes in the ceiling and teleporting. Nightcrawler can teleport to any area within his visual range. Like Logan, Nightcrawler heals by holding down a button, only Nightcrawler constantly takes life gauge damage, and when he heals, it is called "Shadowmeld" or "Shadow Aura", a nod to the comic books (Nightcrawler becomes invisible in shadow). Nightcrawler can teleport behind and combo-attack several foes during a brawl.
 Iceman's levels most closely resemble flight-sim games similar to Star Wars: Rogue Squadron as he continuously rides on his trademark ice slide. Iceman creates an icy path in front of him, flying through the air while shooting his ice beam and ice projectiles. Iceman's attacks are an Ice Beam, which cools off fires and damages foes; Frost Shield, which will cancel any damage he takes while it is "up"; and Hailstorm, which is his main attack, hurling several balls of ice at targets. Iceman will heal automatically as long as he doesn't incur damage for an amount of time. The player must keep up a quick speed when sliding, as slowing down too much will knock Iceman off the slide.

Plot
During a session in the Xavier institute's Danger Room, Logan / Wolverine battles his brother, Victor Creed / Sabretooth, and ultimately ends up losing the session, though he had been saved by the timely arrival of  Iceman, who was there so that Cyclops could train him, but is too crippled with grief to do so due to Jean Grey's apparent death . After Logan trains Iceman in the Danger Room, Professor X warns Logan against trying the Danger Room on "Danger Level 7" again, before asking the X-Men to return to Alkali Lake to retrieve irreplaceable parts to Cerebro. Nightcrawler infiltrates the remnants of William Stryker's base with his teleportation ability, since the weapons systems were somehow operational. Once inside, the X-Men discover a group of agents called HYDRA looting the base. Nightcrawler and Colossus go to find the Cerebro parts while Logan and Storm investigate HYDRA's presence. Logan and Storm discover that Stryker had been building giant robots called Sentinels as another plan to eradicate mutantkind.

Storm is abducted by Lady Deathstrike and Logan pursues her, eventually rescuing Storm. Nightcrawler is plagued by visions of Jason Stryker, who reminds Kurt he left him to die. Nightcrawler retrieves the Cerebro parts, battling a Sentinel in the process. A massive Sentinel - the Master Mold is activated and rises from Alkali Lake. The X-Men and Lady Deathstrike escape; Logan attaches himself to Deathstrike's helicopter to follow her while the other X-Men return to the institute.

Iceman stops Pyro from triggering a meltdown at a nuclear power plant while Storm and Nightcrawler stop Multiple Man from blowing up a bridge . Meanwhile, Logan follows Deathstrike and her HYDRA agents to Japan. Logan learns that Deathstrike and HYDRA are working for the Silver Samurai. After battling though legions of HYDRA forces and "killing" Deathstrike again, Logan confronts Silver Samurai. Samurai reveals that HYDRA helped Stryker build the Sentinels, not realizing he planned to turn them against mutants. Silver Samurai himself is a mutant, and the Master Mold's activation was a mistake. After defeating Silver Samurai, Logan learns that HYDRA has a device in Hong Kong that can stop the Master Mold, where the Master Mold is currently heading. Logan informs Professor Xavier, who contacts Magneto - fearing the X-Men cannot stop the Sentinels alone. Magneto and Sabretooth travel to Hong Kong to help the X-Men. Xavier also reveals that Jason Stryker is still alive; his psyche now fractured into two halves: a good half who has been appearing to Nightcrawler and an evil half that is controlling the Master Mold. He states that another of his students had a similar problem (referring to Jean Grey/Phoenix).

The X-Jet is shot down by Sentinels upon its arrival in Hong Kong. Iceman battles Sentinels and recovers HYDRA's device. Magneto arrives and uses the device to incapacitate the Master Mold, which crashes to the ground, but his helmet is knocked off of his head and Magneto is subdued by Jason's telepathic powers.

Nightcrawler disables the Master Mold's control center, guided by Jason's good half, who helps point the way through the maze of the Mold's body. Nightcrawler disables the Master Mold's neural net, changed by Jason to look like a demonic realm. Meanwhile, Iceman destroys the core of the Master Mold and Logan - in another of Jason's hallucinations - fights several feral clones of himself, emerging victorious. Nightcrawler attempts to save Jason as the Master Mold begins to collapse, but Sabretooth abducts Jason and attempts to make his escape. Logan tracks Sabretooth's scent and confronts him while Kurt escapes with Jason. The two have a vicious battle, ending with Logan throwing Sabretooth from a great height to be impaled below. Jason dies, thanking Nightcrawler for saving him. Magneto leaves, vowing that his next encounter with the X-Men will be as an enemy.

Back at Xavier's mansion, Nightcrawler tells Xavier he does not want to be an X-Man, for their lives are too violent and he is a peaceful man. Xavier tells him he is always welcome in the Mansion, and Kurt leaves . Meanwhile, Cyclops goes to Jean Grey's house and sees her, apparently still alive, with her power spiraling out of control, resulting in her shutting the door on him. The game ends with Cyclops begging to be let inside.

Development
Zak Penn and Chris Claremont co-wrote the story for the game. Penn is the co-writer of X-Men: The Last Stand, and Claremont was a longtime writer of the X-Men comic books, establishing the personas for many of the "new" X-Men team, which featured then new members Storm, Nightcrawler, Colossus, Banshee, and Wolverine. Claremont is best known for the Dark Phoenix Saga.

Reception

X-Men: The Official Game received "mixed or average" reviews, according to review aggregator Metacritic.

On the consoles and PC, some of the problems cited were repetitive gameplay, poor enemy AI and the fact that the Xbox 360 version looked similar to the other console versions despite the better hardware. Detroit Free Press gave the Xbox 360 version three stars out of four and said, "I'd be happier if Cyclops were at my fingertips, too. But all in all, the variety these three X-Men provide is adequate for one little video game". The Times gave the game a mixed review and stated that "nice graphics and smooth gameplay are no substitute for imagination".  However, The A.V. Club gave it a D and stated that "almost everything about this movie cash-in is cheap and incompetent, from the short, forgettable levels to the poor control system to the hand-crampingly repetitive action".

As for the handhelds, the DS version was considered repetitive and hard to control, and the GBA version as a by-the-book platformer.

Notes

References

External links

2006 video games
Action video games
Activision beat 'em ups
Beenox games
Game Boy Advance games
Game Boy Advance-only games
GameCube games
Hypnos Entertainment games
Interquel video games
Nintendo DS games
PlayStation 2 games
Single-player video games
Superhero video games
Windows games
Video games based on Marvel Comics films
Video games based on X-Men films
Video games based on adaptations
Video games based on works by Zak Penn
Video games scored by Chance Thomas
Video games set in Canada
Video games set in Hong Kong
Video games set in New York City
Video games set in Japan
Video games using Havok
X-Men (film series)
Xbox games
Xbox 360 games
WayForward games
Video games developed in the United States
Amaze Entertainment games